Steve Knapman is an Australian television producer. He has received critical acclaim in marketing the genre of police drama to an international audience. His best known television series are with writer Kris Wyld: Wildside, White Collar Blue, East West 101 and The Strip. Knapman has also produced several miniseries for the public broadcasting networks ABC and SBS. The Leaving of Liverpool was the most popular such program of the year in 1992.

References

External links 

Australian television personalities

Australian television producers

Year of birth missing (living people)

Living people